Turkey Street is a London Overground station on the Southbury Loop section of the Lea Valley lines, located in the Bullsmoor area to the north of Enfield in north London.

History
It was known as the Churchbury Loop.

The district served by the line was still predominantly rural, and the coming of the tram to Waltham Cross in 1904 saw the railway unable to compete. Passenger services ceased on 1 October 1909, but were reinstated for the benefit of munitions workers between 1 March 1915 and 1 July 1919.

After that the line was only served by freight trains until the line was electrified as part of a wider scheme, and Turkey Street station reopened to passengers on 21 November 1960. The line is now known as the Southbury Loop.

The station was opened as Forty Hill and did not gain its current name until 1960. The goods depot at the station closed in 1966.

The current station building was built in the late 1980s.  The previous and original station building had a prominent tall chimney stack for the station master's coal fire which brought the top of the chimney above platform level.  The station itself is constructed on an incline and the ticket office area of the track is raised on an embankment so the chimney was very prominent. The interior of the original station consisted of a large ticket hall with the station master's office and serving hatch on the left hand side of the entrance. A tunnel opposite the entrance led to the stairs to the Cheshunt-bound platform.  This tunnel was used in the rebuild.  To the right were the stairs to the Liverpool Street platform.  The stairwells were also reused in the rebuild, but the concrete steps were replaced with steel.

When originally built the station was on the other side of the railway bridge and a wide footbridge over the Turkey Brook led directly to the Cheshunt-bound platform.  This entrance was disused from the early 1970s onwards and the former station building was converted to a newsagent and general store; the footbridge was used for storage for the shop and the entrance to the actual station area had a large iron gate but was bricked up when the station was rebuilt.

The platforms were of standard length and had large open-fronted waiting areas with concrete walls and felt-covered wooden roofs with a long single bench along the rear wall.  These were demolished when the station was rebuilt.

In the 1980s the station was served by British Rail Class 305 EMUs going to and from London Liverpool Street and Cheshunt.  Around the same time as the rebuild the 305s were slowly replaced by British Rail Class 315.  The Cheshunt service was extended to Hertford East in the late 1980s, utilising the existing main line from Cheshunt to Broxbourne and the existing branch to Hertford East. However, in the late 1990s the services again only ran as far as Cheshunt.

The station was rebuilt once again in 2017.

The trains are often used by St Ignatius' College and Lea Valley Academy (previously The Bullsmoor School) pupils, and the station is also popular with commuters due to the availability of local parking.

On 31 May 2015 the station and all services that call here, transferred from Abellio Greater Anglia to London Overground Rail Operations.

Services
The typical off-peak service of trains per hour (tph) is as follows:

Connections
London Buses routes 121, 217, 279, 317, school routes 617, 627 and night route N279 serve the station.

References

External links

Enfield, London
Railway stations in the London Borough of Enfield
Former Great Eastern Railway stations
Railway stations in Great Britain opened in 1891
Railway stations in Great Britain closed in 1909
Railway stations in Great Britain opened in 1915
Railway stations in Great Britain closed in 1919
Railway stations in Great Britain opened in 1960
Reopened railway stations in Great Britain
Railway stations served by London Overground